Moshe Romano (born 6 May 1946) is an Israeli former international footballer.

Career

Club career
Romano played club football for Shimshon Tel Aviv and Beitar Tel Aviv, and was top scorer in the 1965–66, 1969–1970, 1972–1973 and 1974–75 seasons, scoring a total of 193 goals in the Israeli First Division between 1965 and 1982.

International career
Romano represented Israel at international level, and competed in the 1968 AFC Asian Cup and 1970 FIFA World Cup. Romano earned a total of 12 caps between 1965 and 1975, scoring 5 goals.

See also
List of Jewish footballers

References

External links

1946 births
Living people
Israeli footballers
Shimshon Tel Aviv F.C. players
Beitar Tel Aviv F.C. players
Hapoel Yehud F.C. players
Israel international footballers
1968 AFC Asian Cup players
1970 FIFA World Cup players
Footballers from Tel Aviv
Association football forwards